Safra or SAFRA may refer to:

People (surname)
Alberto J. Safra (born 1979/1980), Brazilian banker
Edmond Safra (1932–1999), Syrian-Brazilian banker
Jacob Safra (1891–1963), Syrian banker
Jacqui Safra (born 1948), Swiss investor and actor
Joseph Safra (1939–2020), Brazilian banker
Lily Safra (1934–2022), Brazilian philanthropist and socialite
Moise Safra (1934–2014), Brazilian businessman and philanthropist
Rav Safra (280–338), Babylonian Amora
Shmuel Safra, Israeli computer scientist
Vicky Safra (born 1952/1953), Brazilian-born philanthropist

People (given name)
Safra Catz (born 1961), American business executive

Organizations
Safra Group, an international network of companies controlled by the Joseph Safra family
Banco Safra
Bank Jacob Safra Switzerland
Safra National Bank of New York
SAFRA Radio, a Singaporean broadcasting company
SAFRA National Service Association, Singapore NSmen Recreation Club

Places
Safra, Iran, a village in Khuzestan Province, Iran
Safra-ye Moqaddam, a village in Khuzestan Province, Iran
Safra, Lebanon, a village in Lebanon
 Safra Square, Jerusalem's municipal plaza

Other uses
 Battle of Al-Safra
 Student Aid and Fiscal Responsibility Act